Pekin Public School District 108, a grade school district in Tazewell County, Illinois
 Pekin Community High School District 303, a high school district in Tazewell County, Illinois
 East Washington School Corporation, a school district for all grades, based in Pekin, Washington County, Indiana
 Pekin Community School District, a school district for all grades, based in Jefferson County, Iowa